David Wade may refer to:

David Wade (Louisiana general) (1911–1990), U.S. Army general, namesake of David Wade Correctional Center
David Wade (politician) (born 1950), former South Australian politician

See also
David Wade Ross (born 1977), American baseball catcher
Wade (surname)